Gregory Jay Orton (born August 9, 1962) is a former American football offensive lineman who played one season with the Detroit Lions of the National Football League. He played college football at the University of Nebraska–Lincoln and attended Nebraska City High School in Nebraska City, Nebraska. Orton was also a member of the Detroit Drive of the Arena Football League. He was named Second-team All-Arena in 1990.

References

External links
Just Sports Stats

Living people
1962 births
Players of American football from Nebraska
American football offensive guards
Nebraska Cornhuskers football players
Detroit Lions players
Detroit Drive players
People from Nebraska City, Nebraska
National Football League replacement players